BancFirst Tower, is a signature office skyscraper in Oklahoma City's central business district. Previously known as Liberty Tower (the name it had upon completion), Bank One Tower then Chase Tower (BankOne later merging into JP Morgan, Chase), and most recently Cotter Ranch Tower/Cotter Tower, after real estate holdings owner James Cotter of San Antonio, Texas. 

At 152.4 meters (500 feet), it is the second tallest building in the city and the sixth tallest in the state of Oklahoma.

History
Located at 100 North Broadway Avenue, the 36-floor skyscraper was completed in 1971 for Liberty National Bank and Trust Company, once one of Oklahoma City's largest banks. Liberty Bank was purchased by Bank One in 1997. After the bank's acquisition by Bank One, the tower displayed the Bank One logo. Today the tower presently displays the Chase logo as the bank holds an agreement to lease signage rights on the building.

The anchor of the USS Oklahoma, salvaged after the battleship was sunk at Pearl Harbor on December 7, 1941, was located on the Park Avenue median between Chase Tower and the Skirvin Hilton Hotel until it was moved to its current location at 12th Street and Broadway. The USS Oklahoma was second in casualties only to the USS Arizona on the day of the attack.

7,437 interior lighting fixtures were upgraded in May 2001. The tower was acquired by Cotter Ranch Properties in 2004.

In 2016, Tyler Toney of Dude Perfect set the Guinness World Record for the world's highest basketball shot from the roof of the tower.

Architecture

Tenants
 Anadarko Minerals, Inc. (AMI)
 Anderson McCoy & Orta Attorneys at Law
 BancFirst Headquarters
 Business Aircraft Title International, Inc. (BATI)
 Fellers Snider Attorneys at Law
 Globe Life Insurance
 Hall Estill Attorneys at Law
 Mesa Natural Gas Solutions
 JPMorgan Chase Financial Services
 Morgan Stanley Financial Services
 National Aircraft Finance Association (NAFA)

In addition to hosting other prominent Oklahoma City businesses, the building is home to The Petroleum Club of Oklahoma City, which hosts meetings of Rotary Club Chapter 29, the fourth largest private club in the world.

A transmission tower on the roof offers Sprint Broadband Direct fixed wireless internet service to customers within a 35-mile radius of the tower.  Sprint Broadband Direct stopped accepting new customers in Oklahoma City in 2001, before briefly starting again in 2005.  Sprint officially terminated services on June 30, 2008.

Gallery

See also
List of tallest buildings in Oklahoma City

References

External links

Petroleum Club website

Office buildings completed in 1971
Buildings and structures in Oklahoma City
Skyscraper office buildings in Oklahoma City
1971 establishments in Oklahoma